Utopia Records is an Israeli independent record label that specializes in producing and releasing melodic psytrance music. Utopia Records was established in 2003 by the Israeli DJ Ido Yaron. Most of the musicians signed in Utopia Records are from southern Israel. According to its website, Utopia Records' vision is to "upgrade Eilat's raves and parties while taking electronic music to the next level, in the city of freedom, nature, sea and sun." Its website also offers a mailing list, free download of one track in a month and a currently inactive online shop.

Musicians

  Ananda Shake (Osher Swissa and Lior Edri)
 Early works by Swissa only are titled as "Ananda"
  Audiotec (Miki Damski)
  Brain Damage (Vikenty Shagal)
  Mahamudra (Ran Malka, Eyal Cohen and Sagiv Ben-Giat)
  Phanatic (Kfir Lankry)
 Once part of the duo Bizarre Contact with Didi Ezra
  Stereomatic (Eliran Maimone)
  Sundose (Avshalom Elmaliah and Mishel Atias)
 Together with Osher Swissa they were the 1998 Goa trance group Psycholoop
  Vibe Tribe (Stas Marniansky)
  Spade (Elmar Ivatarov)
 Was part of Vibe Tribe until April 2007

DJs

 DJ Ido
 DJ D.vision
 DJ Firaga
 DJ Kin
 DJ Kitty (K.I.T.T.Y)
 DJ Matte
 DJ SubSonix

Discography

2003
VA – Born Again (compilation by DJ Ido)
VA – Exodus (compilation by DJ Ido)

2004
Perplex – Circles Of Life
VA – Pure Imagination Vol. 1 (compilation by DJ Ido)
VA – Timeless (compilation by DJ Ido)
Audiotec – The Magic Of Love
Vibe Tribe – Melodrama

2005
Ananda Shake – Emotion In Motion
VA – Pure Imagination 2 (compilation by Sixsense)
Chemical Drive – Sonic Boom
VA – Re-Start (compilation by Ananda Shake)

2006
VA – Pure Imagination 3 (compilation by DJ Ido)
Ananda Shake – We Speak Music
Audiotec – Freak Show
Vibe Tribe – Wise Cracks
Phanatic – In My Head
VA – K-Files (compilation by Danny K)
VA – Loud & Clear (compilation by DJ Kitty, originally called "Pure Imagination 4")

2007
Mahamudra – Reality Is Just A Mtyh
VA – Pure Imagination 4 (compilation by DJ Ido)
Brain Damage – Waiting For My Angel
Ananda Shake – Inside The Sound

Future albums 
Spade's debut solo album

See also
List of record labels

External links
Utopia-Records.com – The official website (incompatible with Mozilla Firefox)
Utopia Records at Discogs
Utopia Records at Psychedelic Trance Database

Eilat
Israeli independent record labels
Psychedelic trance record labels
Record labels established in 2003